Nohar is a city and a municipality in Hanumangarh district in the Indian state of Rajasthan India

Geography 
Nohar is a semi-arid area and experiences very low rainfall. Summer in Nohar is full of sandstorms and low rainfall owing to poor monsoon. Sometimes, it gets rainfall in winter due to western disturbances. Summer temperature is approximate 49 and in winter 2 to 3 degrees Celsius. There is a bus stand and railway station here.

Language 
Bagri, a dialect of Rajasthani language, is spoken by a majority of the population. A little influence of Haryanvi and Punjabi language can also be noticed here because of the close proximity of this town to Haryana and Punjab, and family relationships between the people of Nohar and citizens of Sirsa district of Haryana nearby.. Large number of population is of Ahir community is found.

References

 Cities and towns in Hanumangarh district